Newton USD 373 is a public unified school district headquartered in Newton, Kansas, United States. The district includes the communities of Newton, North Newton, Walton, McLain and nearby rural areas.

Schools
The school district operates the following schools:

High school
 Newton High School in Newton (9-12)

 Intermediate schools
 Chisholm Middle School in Newton (7-8)
 Santa Fe 5/6 Center in Newton (5-6)

 Elementary
 Northridge Elementary in Newton (K-4)
 Slate Creek Elementary in Newton (K-4)
 South Breeze Elementary in Newton (K-4)
 Sunset Elementary in Newton (K-4)
 Walton Rural Life Center in Walton (K-4)

 Early education 
 Cooper Early Education in Newton (Pre-K)

See also
 List of high schools in Kansas
 List of unified school districts in Kansas
 Kansas State Department of Education
 Kansas State High School Activities Association

References

External links
 

School districts in Kansas
Education in Harvey County, Kansas